HIStory: Our Place In His Story is the sixth and final original album from the Christian hip hop group the Cross Movement, released on August 22, 2007. It received a Grammy Award nomination for Best Rock Or Rap Gospel Album.

Track listing
Our God  
Louder  
Trust In Him (feat. Robert “Don” Barham)
Spare Change
Tapestry  
I Love You
9-10  
Back For This  
Clap Your Hands  
Name Up (feat. Tedashii)
Get That  
Now Who’s the Man? (feat. Iz-Real)
Clarity (feat. Mac the Doulos)
Whatchu Say?  
We Were They  
Big Things
The Last Cypha (feat. Trip Lee, R-Swift, Mac the Doulos, Iz-Real, FLAME & Da’ T.R.U.T.H.)

2007 albums
The Cross Movement albums
Cross Movement Records albums